Dietmar Moos is a former West German slalom canoeist who competed from the mid-1970s to the mid-1980s. He won two medals in the C-1 team event at the ICF Canoe Slalom World Championships with a silver in 1977 and a bronze in 1975.

References

German male canoeists
Living people
Year of birth missing (living people)
Medalists at the ICF Canoe Slalom World Championships